How to Destroy Angels is the debut extended play by British experimental band Coil. At this point, the group consisted only of John Balance and Peter Christopherson. It was originally released in 1984 on L.A.Y.L.A.H. Antirecords, but was later re-pressed in 1988.

Background
The record has two songs on it, each taking up each one side of vinyl in its entirety. The contents of the B-side varied over repressings: the first edition contained noise-filled grooves, the second edition held playable, multi-layered music, and the third edition contained a flat, grooveless face.

Originally, track "How to Destroy Angels" was intended to be the B-side of the track "Silence and Secrecy", but due to Christopherson and Balance leaving Psychic TV, owners of Temple Records, the idea was shelved. "Silence and Secrecy" has only been released in partial form by way of a two-minute excerpt on the Zos Kia and early Coil retrospective Transparent.

Both songs appeared, with additional remixes, on the album How to Destroy Angels (Remixes and Re-Recordings).

How to Destroy Angels is also the name of Trent Reznor's (of Nine Inch Nails fame) side project together with his wife Mariqueen Maandig and Atticus Ross. Reznor has acknowledged that the earlier Coil release was the source of the band's name and that he had run the idea by Peter Christopherson before using it.

Track listing

Side one
 "How to Destroy Angels" – 16:45

Side two
 "Absolute Elsewhere" – 22:47

Personnel 
 John Balance – performer
 Peter Christopherson – performer

Notes

External links
 
 
 How to Destroy Angels at Brainwashed

1984 debut EPs
Coil (band) EPs